The South Seas is a 1979 Spanish novel written by Manuel Vázquez Montalbán. It was listed as one of the best hundred novels in 20th century. In 1979 it received the Premio Planeta.

References

1979 novels
Detective novels
Novels by Manuel Vázquez Montalbán
Grand Prix de Littérature Policière winners